Fables & Dreams is the second studio album from the Swiss symphonic metal band Lunatica.  It was released on October 18, 2004.

Track listing

References

Lunatica albums
2004 albums
Frontiers Records albums